Secusio is a genus of moths in the subfamily Arctiinae first described by Francis Walker in 1854.

Species

Former species

References

Walker (1854). List of the Specimens of Lepidopterous Insects in the Collection of the British Museum. Part II. Lepidoptera Heterocera. 2: i–iv, 279–581.

Arctiinae